The 2003–04 Interliga season was the fifth season of the multi-national ice hockey league. Nine teams participated in the league, and Podhale Nowy Targ from Poland have won the championship.

Regular season

Play-offs

Quarter-finals

Semi-finals

Final

External links
Season on www.hockeyarchives.info

Interliga (1999–2007) seasons
2003–04 in European ice hockey leagues
Inter